Alfriston is a small suburb of Auckland, New Zealand's largest city. Prior to November 2010 it was under the authority of the Papakura District Council and is now part of the enlarged Auckland city. The suburb is in the Manurewa-Papakura ward, one of the thirteen administrative divisions of Auckland Council.

The town was settled in the 1840s and was named after Alfriston, Sussex, home of one of the earliest settlers, Dr George Edward Bodle. The name of the town means Aelfric's village, named for Ælfric of Eynsham.

Demographics

Alfriston had a population of 3,807 at the 2018 New Zealand census, an increase of 327 people (9.4%) since the 2013 census, and an increase of 1,287 people (51.1%) since the 2006 census. There were 1,059 households, comprising 1,848 males and 1,959 females, giving a sex ratio of 0.94 males per female. The median age was 36.0 years (compared with 37.4 years nationally), with 726 people (19.1%) aged under 15 years, 816 (21.4%) aged 15 to 29, 1,656 (43.5%) aged 30 to 64, and 606 (15.9%) aged 65 or older.

Ethnicities were 40.3% European/Pākehā, 10.1% Māori, 13.9% Pacific peoples, 41.8% Asian, and 5.4% other ethnicities. People may identify with more than one ethnicity.

The percentage of people born overseas was 46.3, compared with 27.1% nationally.

Although some people chose not to answer the census's question about religious affiliation, 26.3% had no religion, 38.9% were Christian, 0.6% had Māori religious beliefs, 9.9% were Hindu, 3.9% were Muslim, 3.1% were Buddhist and 12.6% had other religions.

Of those at least 15 years old, 753 (24.4%) people had a bachelor's or higher degree, and 561 (18.2%) people had no formal qualifications. The median income was $32,300, compared with $31,800 nationally. 525 people (17.0%) earned over $70,000 compared to 17.2% nationally. The employment status of those at least 15 was that 1,572 (51.0%) people were employed full-time, 336 (10.9%) were part-time, and 93 (3.0%) were unemployed.

Alfriston has one secondary school, Alfriston College.

Education
It opened in 2004.

Both these schools are coeducational. Rolls are as of

References

External links 
Photographs of Alfriston held in Auckland Libraries' heritage collections.

Suburbs of Auckland